The St. Pius X High School shooting occurred on October 27, 1975, at St. Pius X High School in Ottawa, Ontario. It was Canada's second recorded school shooting. The gunman, Robert Poulin, an 18-year-old St. Pius student, opened fire on his classmates with a shotgun, killing a 17-year-old classmate named Mark Hough and wounding five others before killing himself with a single shotgun blast to the head. Earlier that day, Poulin had raped and sodomized a 17-year-old Sri Lankan girl named Kim Rabot in his own bedroom before stabbing her to death. That afternoon, he had traveled to the St. Pius X High School to embark upon his shooting spree.

Poulin hailed from a military family and held military aspirations of his own, having repeatedly remarked to his parents of his desire to become a pilot within the Royal Canadian Air Force. These were largely thwarted by his physical condition and psychological immaturity, resulting in his being rejected from the officer training program he applied to. His physical problems included poor eyesight and a chest deformity.

Poulin had been suicidal for at least three years prior to his attack and was obsessed with sex and pornography, having repeatedly written in his diaries about his desire to experience sex before he died.

A book entitled Rape of a Normal Mind was later written about the incident.

See also
Brampton Centennial Secondary School shooting, Canada's first recorded school shooting

References

Cited works and further reading

External links
 28 October 1975 edition of the Ottawa Sun
 2012 Ottawa Sun interview with St. Pius X High School shooting survivor Barclay Holbrook

1975 in Canada
1975 in Ontario
1970s in Ottawa
Deaths by firearm in Ontario
History of Ottawa
1975 crimes in Canada
Murder–suicides in Canada
October 1975 events in Canada
School killings in Canada
School shootings in Canada
1975 murders in Canada
Crime in Ottawa

ja:ロバート・プーリン